KSJT may refer to:

 KSJT-FM, a radio station (107.5 FM) licensed to San Angelo, Texas, United States
 San Angelo Regional Airport (ICAO code KSJT)